British musical duo Zero 7 has released four studio albums, four compilation and remix albums, seven extended plays and nineteen singles.

Albums

Studio albums

Remixes and compilations

EPs

Singles

Music videos

Soundtracks, compilations and media appearances 
 "In the Waiting Line" - 2008 Summer Olympics
 "Today" - The Boys and Girls Guide to Getting Down
 "In the Waiting Line" - Sex and the City
 "In the Waiting Line" - House MD
 "In the Waiting Line" - Numb3rs
 "In the Waiting Line" - Scrubs
 "In the Waiting Line" - Garden State (can be found on the Garden State soundtrack)
 "Destiny" - Blue Crush/Raising Helen/I'm With Lucy/Lacoste website/The O.C./Roswell/True Life/Obsessed
 "Truth and Rights" - Another Late Night
 "Destiny (Hefner's Destiny's Chill)" - The Chillout Project
 "Give it Away" - CSI: Crime Scene Investigation
 "Somersault" - Guess Who/The O.C./Annapolis
 "Distractions" - Six Feet Under
 "To Ulrike M. (Zero 7 Mix)" - Hôtel Costes, Vol. 2: La Suite
 "Polaris" & "In the Waiting Line" - Sex and the City
 "In the Waiting Line (Dorfmeister Con Madrid De Los Austrias Dub)" - Confidence
 "When it Falls" - The West Wing
 "Look Up" - Goal!
 "End Theme" - CSI: Crime Scene Investigation
 "Throw it All Away" - Studio 60 on the Sunset Strip
 "Destiny (Acoustic Mix)" - Acoustic 3
 "Pageant of the Bizarre"- The O.C.
 "Waiting to Die"- The O.C.
 "Passing By"- The O.C.
 "Somersault (Danger Mouse Mix)"- Entourage (U.S. TV series)
 "Home" - Ministry of Sound Chillout Sessions 5
 "Warm Sound" - West Wing - S05E018 - Access
 "Pageant of the Bizarre" - Warren Miller's Off The Grid
 "I Go to Sleep" - The Saturday Sessions: The Dermot O'Leary Show (2007 compilation album)
 "I Have Seen" - Shortland Street 2010 promo
 "Distractions" - Tracy Beaker Returns

Remixes by various artists 
 Distractions (Bugz in the Attic Remix)
 Distractions (Bugz Cooperative Dub)
 Distractions (DJ Spinna Remix)
 Distractions (Version Idjut)
 Distractions (Madlib's YNQ Remix)
 Distractions (Block 16 Remix)
 Destiny (Photek Remix)
 Destiny (Hefner's Destiny's Chill)
 Destiny (Simian Remix)
 End Theme (Roni Size's Tear It Up Remix)
 End Theme (Roni Size's Tear It Down Remix)
 End Theme (Herbert's Unrealised Remix)
 Futures (Metronomy Remix)
 Futures (Block 16 Mix)
 In the Waiting Line (Aquanote's Naked Adaptation)
 In the Waiting Line (Diaspora Mix, Osunlade Instrumental)
 In the Waiting Line (Slide Remix)
 In the Waiting Line (Dorfmeister Con Madrid De Los Austrias Dub)
 In the Waiting Line (Koop Remix)
 In the Waiting Line (S.P.Y. Remix)
 Home (Stereolab Remix)
 Home (Ben Watt Remix)
 Somersault (Yam Who? Mix)
 Somersault (Danger Mouse Remix)
 Somersault (Hot Chip Remix)
 Throw It All Away (Dilla Circulate Mix)
 Today (Pépé Bradock Mix)
 Warm Sound (Remystify Mix)
 Warm Sound (Justin Haylock Mix)
 Warm Sound (inputJunkie Remix) 
 You're My Flame (Dabrye Remix)
 You're My Flame (Justus Köhncke Vox Mix)

Remixes by Zero 7 
 To Ulrike M. - Doris Days
 Up With People - Lambchop
 If You Can't Say No - Lenny Kravitz
 Climbing Up The Walls - Radiohead
 Twisty Bass - Neil Finn
 Umi Says - Mos Def
 Low Five - Sneaker Pimps
 Provider - N.E.R.D.
 Love Theme From Spartacus - Terry Callier
 Moon To Let - Tina Dico
 The Absentee - Half Cousin
 Hey Now - London Grammar
 In This Shirt - The Irrepressibles
 Our Song - Ultraísta
 Crush - Hello Skinny

Notes

References

Discographies of British artists
Pop music group discographies
Electronic music discographies